Aspartate—tRNAAsn ligase (nondiscriminating aspartyl-tRNA synthetase) is an enzyme with systematic name L-aspartate:tRNAAsx ligase (AMP-forming). This enzyme catalyses the following chemical reaction

 ATP + L-aspartate + tRNAAsx  AMP + diphosphate + aspartyl-tRNAAsx

The 3 substrates of this enzyme are ATP, L-asparagine, and tRNAAsx, whereas its 3 products are AMP, diphosphate, and asparaginyl-tRNAAsx.

When this enzyme acts on tRNAAsp, it catalyses the same reaction as EC 6.1.1.12, aspartate---tRNA ligase. It has, however, diminished discrimination, so that it can also form aspartyl-tRNAAsn. This relaxation of specificity has been found to result from the absence of a loop in the tRNA that specifically recognizes the third position of the anticodon [1]. This accounts for the ability of this enzyme in, for example, Thermus thermophilus, to recognize both tRNAAsp (GUC anticodon) and tRNAAsn (GUU anticodon). The aspartyl-tRNAAsn is not used in protein synthesis until it is converted by EC 6.3.5.6, asparaginyl-tRNA synthase (glutamine-hydrolysing), into asparaginyl-tRNAAsn.

This enzyme belongs to the family of ligases, to be specific those forming carbon-oxygen bonds in aminoacyl-tRNA and related compounds.  The systematic name of this enzyme class is L-asparaginyl:tRNAAsx ligase (AMP-forming). This enzyme is also called nondiscriminating asparaginyl-tRNA synthetase.  This enzyme participates in alanine and asparagine metabolism.

References 

EC 6.1.1
Enzymes of unknown structure